Hiroyuki Kanno (born July 3, 1952), is a Japanese jurist who has served as an associate Justice of the Supreme Court of Japan since 2016.

Education and Career 
Kanno was born on July 3, 1952 in Japan. He attended Tohoku University and graduated with a degree in law in 1978. That year, he was appointed as a legal apprentice. In 1980, Kanno joined the Family Court of the Tokyo District Court as a judge. Starting in 1990, Kanno served as a justice in many different Japanese courts. These include:

 1990-1991: Judge, Tokyo District Court.
 1991-1995: Judge, Sapporo Family Court.
 1995-2000: Research official for the Supreme Court of Japan.
 2000-2002: Judge, Tokyo High Court
 2002-2012: Presiding Judge, Tokyo District Court
 2012-2014: Chief Judge, Mito District Court
 2014-2015: Presiding Judge, Tokyo High Court
 2015-2016: Presiding Judge, Osaka High Court

Supreme Court 
On September 5, 2016, Kanno was appointed to the Supreme Court of Japan. In Japan, justices are formally nominated by the Emperor (at that time, Akihito) but in reality the Cabinet chooses the nominees and the Emperor's role is a formality.

Kanno's term is scheduled to end on July 2, 2022 (one day before he turns 70). This is because all members of the court have a mandatory retirement age of 70.

References

Kanno, Hiroyuki
Kanno, Hiroyuki
Kanno, Hiroyuki